A. B. Sakthivel Mudaliar is an Indian politician and incumbent member of the Tamil Nadu Legislative Assembly from the Salem South constituency. He represents the Anna Dravida Munnetra Kazhagam party.

References

Living people
Year of birth missing (living people)
Tamil Nadu MLAs 2016–2021
All India Anna Dravida Munnetra Kazhagam politicians